The 1967 Purdue Boilermakers football team was an American football team that represented Purdue University during the 1967 Big Ten Conference football season. In their 12th season under head coach Jack Mollenkopf, the Boilermakers compiled an 8–2 record, finished in a three-way tie for the Big Ten Conference championship with a 6–1 record against conference opponents, and outscored all opponents by a combined total of 291 to 154.

The Boilermakers missed the opportunity to win the conference championship outright by losing the battle for the Old Oaken Bucket to archrival Indiana. Had Purdue won, it would not have gone to the Rose Bowl due to the Big Ten's "no-repeat" rule, which banned teams from making consecutive appearances in Pasadena.

Purdue's junior running back Leroy Keyes rushed for 986 yards in 1967, was selected as a consensus first-team All-American, and was later inducted into the College Football Hall of Fame.  Other notable players from the 1967 Purdue team included quarterback Mike Phipps, running back Perry Williams, offensive end Jim Beirne, offensive tackle Chuck Kuzneski, offensive guard Bob Sebeck, middle guard Chuck Kyle, linebacker Dick Marvel, defensive ends George Olion and Bob Holmes, defensive tackle Lance Olssen, and defensive back Tim Foley.

Schedule

Roster

Game summaries

Notre Dame

at Iowa

 Leroy Keyes 14 rushes, 145 yards

at Illinois
 Leroy Keyes 21 rushes, 225 yards

Michigan State

 Leroy Keyes 24 rushes, 193 yards

at Indiana

Source: 
    
    
    
    
    

 Perry Williams 24 rushes, 124 yards
 Leroy Keyes 20 rushes, 114 yards

References

Purdue
Purdue Boilermakers football seasons
Big Ten Conference football champion seasons
Purdue Boilermakers football